Nguni may refer to:

Nguni languages
Nguni cattle
Nguni people
Nguni sheep, which divide into the Zulu, Pedi, and Swazi types
Nguni stick-fighting
 Nguni shield
 Nguni homestead
Nguni (surname)

Language and nationality disambiguation pages